is a passenger railway station located in the city of Higashiyamato, Tokyo, Japan, operated by the private railway operator Seibu Railway.

Lines
Higashi-Yamatoshi Station is served by the Seibu Haijima Line, and is located 5.7 kilometers from the starting point of that line at Kodaira Station.

Station layout
There are two elevated opposed side platforms serving two tracks on the second floor, accessed by stairs, escalators and lifts, with the station building and ticket gates underneath at ground level.

Platforms

Services
Trains run 04:55-00:40 weekdays and 04:55-00:25 weekends. The typical hourly weekday off-peak service is:
6 trains calling at all stations to Kodaira, of which:
3 continue as Expresses to Seibu-Shinjuku, calling at all stations to Tanashi, then Kami-Shakujii, Saginomiya, Takadanobaba, and Seibu-Shinjuku
6 trains to Tamagawa-Jōsui, of which:
4 continue to Haijima, calling at all stations

Typical journey times are 9 minutes to Kodaira, 12 minutes to Haijima, and 37 minutes to Seibu-Shinjuku on the direct Express trains. The off-peak Local trains to Kodaira connect there to Express trains from Hon-Kawagoe to Seibu-Shinjuku.
During the morning and evening rush hours on weekdays, Semi-Express trains run to Seibu-Shinjuku, calling at all stations to Kami-Shakujii, then Saginomiya, Takadanobaba, and Seibu-Shinjuku, with a total journey time of between 37 and 48 minutes.

History
It gained its current name on March 25, 1979, and was elevated on July 17, 1980.

Station numbering was introduced on all Seibu Railway lines during fiscal 2012, with Higashi-Yamatoshi Station becoming "SS32".

Passenger statistics
In fiscal 2019, the station was the 42nd busiest on the Seibu network with an average of 25,177 passengers daily. 

The passenger figures for previous years are as shown below.

See also
 List of railway stations in Japan

References

External links

 Higashi-Yamatoshi Station information (Seibu Railway) 

Seibu Haijima Line
Railway stations in Tokyo
Railway stations in Japan opened in 1950
Stations of Seibu Railway
Higashiyamato, Tokyo